The Solitario (El Solitario) is a large geologic formation in Big Bend Ranch State Park in West Texas. When viewed from above, it suggests an impact crater; though it is actually the eroded remains of a laccolith. The geology of the Solitario is complex. In 1988 the state of Texas purchased the property containing the Solitario and created Big Bend Ranch State Park.

The formation lies in the Chihuahuan Desert ecoregion of the United States.

Geology
The Solitario is a structural dome developed in Paleozoic and Cretaceous rocks above an Eocene granite laccolith intrusion. The dome is associated with radial rhyolite to trachyte dikes and  sills and erupted ash flow tuffs. The 16 km diameter dome contains a 6 by 2 km volcanic caldera filled with collapse breccia, tuff, and trachyte lava.

The Paleozoic rocks of the dome consist of a 2.6 km thick section of intensely folded Cambrian through Early Pennsylvanian sediments. The Paleozoic rocks were deformed and thrust into the area from the southeast during the Ouachita orogeny. Following the Permian uplift and erosion during most of the Mesozoic was followed by deposition of Cretaceous carbonate rocks which correlate with the Cretaceous of the Gulf Coast. The area was uplifted by the Laramide orogeny during latest Cretaceous. Following the Eocene intrusive and volcanic events of the Solitario, the area was partially covered by volcanic rocks from the adjacent Bofecillos volcanic center to the west of the area during the Oligocene and early Miocene. Erosion and downcutting following the Pleistocene deepening of the Rio Grande to the southwest and south have produced the current topographic expression of the area.

See also

Big Bend National Park
List of Texas state parks
Trans-Pecos
Guadalupe Mountains
McKittrick Canyon

References

External links
Big Bend Ranch State Park.
 Flora and Vegetation of the Solitario Dome, Jean Evans Hardy, Iron Mountain Press - 2009
Photos of West Texas

Geography of Brewster County, Texas
Geography of Presidio County, Texas
Geologic formations of Texas